Emese Antal (born February 13, 1971 in Târgu Mureș) is a former ice speed skater from Romania, who after her marriage with an Austrian became known as Emese Dörfler-Antal. She represented Austria in two consecutive Winter Olympics, starting in 1994 in Hamar, Norway.

External links
 SkateResults 
 Photos of Emese Antal

1971 births
Living people
Austrian female speed skaters
Romanian female speed skaters
Sportspeople from Târgu Mureș
Speed skaters at the 1994 Winter Olympics
Speed skaters at the 1998 Winter Olympics
Olympic speed skaters of Austria